Kellermann is a German surname. Notable people with the surname include:

Arthur Kellermann (born 1955), American physician, epidemiologist and academic
David Kellermann (1969–2007), Freddie Mac acting chief financial officer
François Christophe de Kellermann (1735–1820), 1st Duc de Valmy, one of Napoleon's officers, a Marshal of France
François Christophe Edmond de Kellermann (1802–1868), 3rd Duc de Valmy, French politician, political historian and diplomat, son of François Étienne
François Étienne de Kellermann (1770–1835), 2nd Duc de Valmy, French general in the Napoleonic Wars, son of François Christophe
Georgine Kellermann (born 1957), German journalist
Kenneth Kellermann (born 1937), American astronomer
Susan Kellermann (born 1944), American actress

See also
Kellerman

German-language surnames